Ari Pakarinen (born 14 May 1969) is a retired male javelin thrower from Finland. His personal best throw is 85.18 metres, achieved in July 1995 in Lapua.

He finished fifth at the 1993 World Championships. He later qualified for the final at the 2002 European Championships, but finished last with no valid result.

International competitions

Seasonal bests
1986 - 56.04
1987 - 64.04
1988 - 71.46
1989 - 79.39
1990 - 80.76
1991 - 82.52
1992 - 84.00
1993 - 83.08
1994 - 83.38
1995 - 85.18
1996 - 77.64
1997 - 77.80
1998 - 76.70
1999 - 77.97
2000 - 78.71
2001 - 81.27
2002 - 83.03
2003 - 76.80
2004 - 79.27

References

1969 births
Living people
Finnish male javelin throwers
World Athletics Championships athletes for Finland
20th-century Finnish people
21st-century Finnish people